Mironovsky is a rural locality (a khutor) in Mirnoye Rural Settlement, Novonikolayevsky District, Volgograd Oblast, Russia. The population was 32 as of 2010. There are 3 streets.

Geography 
Mironovsky is located in steppe, on the Khopyorsko-Buzulukskaya Plain, on the bank of the Karavochka River, 53 km northeast of Novonikolayevsky (the district's administrative centre) by road. Mirny is the nearest rural locality.

References 

Rural localities in Novonikolayevsky District